Kwame Nkrumah University of Science and Technology Library System serves the students, faculty, researchers and staff of the Kwame Nkrumah University of Science and Technology, Kumasi Ghana. The Library System which is considered as one of the Academic libraries in Ghana consist of the main library (Prempeh II Library), six other college libraries, Basic School, and Distance Learning Libraries. The Prempeh II Library and the other satellite libraries delivers information services to approximately 40,000 undergraduate, 2,000 postgraduate students and 3,000 full-time staff members in the university community

History 
Prempeh II Library is the university library of the Kwame Nkrumah University of Science and Technology

The library was established as a result of the transfer of the library collection of the Teacher Training Department of Achimota College to the Kumasi College of Technology, Science and Arts (now Kwame Nkrumah University of Science and Technology) in January 1952.

Libraries 
The KNUST Library System consists of:

– Prempeh II Library (Main Library)
– College of Arts and Built Environment Library
– College of Science Library
– College of Agriculture and Natural Resources Library
– College of Health Library
– College of Engineering Library
– College of Humanities & Social Sciences Library

The University Main Library (Prempeh II Library) is the management centre for all library operations within the university. It provides staff and technical services as well as coordinates the activities of the College Libraries. The Prempeh II Library which is located in-between The Royal Parade Ground and The Great Hall of the university is currently divided into five departments: Academic Support, Collection Development and Management, Library Administration, Students Support, and Systems and Supports.

Apart from the Traditional services offered by the Library, the Library also provides space for group discussions, e-Books, e-Journals, e-Catalogue (Alexandria) and KNUSTSpace (Institutional Repository) to the University Community and other stakeholders.

References 

Education in Ghana
Libraries in Ghana
Academic libraries in Ghana
Libraries established in 1952